Manzanar is a historic site of a former World War II Japanese-American incarceration camp

Manzanar (apple orchard in the Spanish language, plural manzanares) may also refer to:
 Manzanar, California, former settlement and agricultural area

Manzanares may refer to:

People
César Vidal Manzanares (born 1958), Spanish historian and author
Francisco Antonio Manzanares (1843–1904), American businessman and politician
Marina Manzanares Monjarás, Salvadoran political activist
Myrna Manzanares (1946–2021), Belizan activist and writer
Rafael Manzanares Aguilar (1918–1999), Honduran folklorist, author and composer

Places

Spain
Manzanares (river), flowing through Madrid
Manzanares Park, near Madrid
Estadio Manzanares, stadium in Madrid
Manzanares, Ciudad Real, municipality in Ciudad Real Province
Hoyo de Manzanares, municipality in Madrid Province 
Manzanares el Real, town in Madrid Province

South America
Manzanares, Caldas in Columbia
Manzanares District in Peru
Manzanares River (South America) in Venezuela

Other
Manzanar Airfield, former airport in Owens Valley, alternative Name of Inyo County Airport